is a passenger railway station located in the city of Izumisano, Osaka Prefecture, Japan, operated by the private railway operator Nankai Electric Railway. It has the station number "NK33".

Lines

Layout
The station consists of one island platform and one side platform connected by an underground passage.

Platforms

Adjacent stations

History
Hagurazaki Station opened on 1 February 1942.

Passenger statistics
In fiscal 2019, the station was used by an average of 6190 passengers daily.

Surrounding area
 Izumisano City Sano Junior High School

See also
 List of railway stations in Japan

References

External links

  

Railway stations in Japan opened in 1942
Railway stations in Osaka Prefecture
Izumisano